Vera Matthews-Irving (1 September 1913 – 5 July 2008) was a Canadian painter. Her work was part of the painting event in the art competition at the 1948 Summer Olympics.

References

1913 births
2008 deaths
20th-century Canadian painters
Canadian women painters
Olympic competitors in art competitions
Artists from Toronto
20th-century Canadian women artists